This is a list of buildings that survived the Great Fire of London in 1666 and are still standing.

See also 
 Great Fire of London
 List of demolished buildings and structures in London

References

Great Fire of London
Lists of buildings and structures in London